"Monkey Business" is a song by American heavy metal band Skid Row. It was released in June 1991 as the lead single from their second album, Slave to the Grind (1991). It was written by bandmates Rachel Bolan and Dave "The Snake" Sabo.

Background
The song was the biggest hit on Slave to the Grind. Although the song did not appear on the US Billboard Hot 100, it reached number 13 on the Album Rock Tracks chart. The song also charted at number 19 on the UK Singles Chart.

Track listing
 "Monkey Business"
 "Slave to the Grind"
 "Riot Act"

Personnel
 Sebastian Bach – lead vocals
 Dave Sabo – lead guitar, backing vocals
 Scotti Hill – rhythm guitar, backing vocals
 Rachel Bolan – bass, backing vocals
 Rob Affuso – drums

Charts

Covers
 Croatian hard rock band Animal Drive covered the song on their EP Back to the Roots (2019).

References

Skid Row (American band) songs
1991 singles
Songs written by Dave Sabo
Songs written by Rachel Bolan